Kalaleh-ye Sofla (also Romanized as Kalāleh-ye Soflá; also known as Galāleh Soflá, Kalāleh, Kalaleh-e Pā‘īn, Kalāleh-ye Pā’īn, Kalali, and Kialala) is a village in Minjavan-e Gharbi Rural District, Minjavan District, Khoda Afarin County, East Azerbaijan Province, Iran. At the 2006 census, its population was 201, in 37 families.

References 

Populated places in Khoda Afarin County